Michael Janker (born 23 March 1992) is a German sports shooter. He competed in the men's 10 metre air rifle event at the 2016 Summer Olympics where he finished in 29th place in the qualifications and did not advance.

References

External links
 

1992 births
Living people
German male sport shooters
Olympic shooters of Germany
Shooters at the 2016 Summer Olympics
Place of birth missing (living people)
European Games competitors for Germany
Shooters at the 2015 European Games
Sportspeople from Upper Bavaria
21st-century German people
20th-century German people
People from Landsberg (district)